The 2004 Asian Taekwondo Championships are the 16th edition of the Asian Taekwondo Championships, and were held in Seongnam, South Korea from May 20 to May 23, 2004.

Medal summary

Men

Women

Medal table

External links
 www.wtf.org

Asian Championships
Asian Taekwondo Championships
Asian Taekwondo Championships
International taekwondo competitions hosted by South Korea